The Financial Star Building is a 30-story,  skyscraper office building completed in 1993 and located in Zhongli District, Taoyuan, Taiwan. When the building was completed in 1993, it was the tallest building in Taoyuan city and it held the title for 19 years until it was overtaken by ChungYuet Royal Landmark in 2012. Financial Star Building was also the first building to exceed  in Taoyuan and was one of the earliest skyscrapers in the city. As of December 2020, the building is the 3rd tallest in Taoyuan City (after ChungYuet Royal Landmark and ChungYuet World Center). The location of the building is near Zhongli railway station.

See also
 List of tallest buildings in Asia
 List of tallest buildings in Taiwan
 List of tallest buildings in Taoyuan City

References

1993 establishments in Taiwan
Office buildings completed in 1993
Skyscraper office buildings in Taiwan
Buildings and structures in Taoyuan City
Skyscrapers in Taoyuan